Crucis Margin is a 1981 science fiction role-playing game supplement published by Judges Guild for Traveller.

Contents
Crucis Margin details the Gateway Quadrant of near-Imperial space.

Publication history
Crucis Margin was written by Dave Sering and was published in 1981 by Judges Guild as a 32-page book with a map.

Judges Guild published Traveller supplements from 1979 to 1982, detailing full sectors of the Imperium, and according to Shannon Appelcline: "The result was a set of four publications: Ley Sector (1980), Glimmerdrift Reaches (1981), Crucis Margin (1981), and Maranatha-Alkahest Sector (1981). Together these sectors comprised the Gateway Quadrant; along with complementary adventures published by Judges Guild, they offered the most comprehensive and cohesive view of any part of the Traveller universe, with the possible exception of the Spinward Marches."

Reception
William A. Barton reviewed Crucis Margin in The Space Gamer No. 46. Barton commented that "Crucis Margin will undoubtedly open up new areas of adventure on the trailing edge of the Imperium for those adventurers looking to escape the ravages of the Fifth Frontier War to spinward. Unless the dollar price hike over the earlier sectors is too much for you, this supplement should join them in your Traveller library."

Tony Watson reviewed Glimmerdrift Reaches and Crucis Margin for Chaosium's Different Worlds magazine, and noted that "As pre-generated sectors for Traveller play go, these offerings by Judges Guild are about as good as any on the market."

References

Judges Guild publications
Role-playing game supplements introduced in 1981
Traveller (role-playing game) supplements